The Last Married Couple in America is a 1980 comedy film released in the US.

It was directed by Gilbert Cates, whose most successful film Oh, God! Book II, was released in the same year. The film starred George Segal and Natalie Wood as a California couple in the late 1970s struggling to maintain their "happily married" status as all their friends begin to get divorces and seem to be caught up in the decadence of the sexual revolution and the "ME" era. This is the last completed theatrical release Natalie Wood made before her death in 1981.

Plot

Life is going along smoothly for Jeff and Mari Thompson but not for any other couple they know, or so it seems. Everyone they know is getting divorced.

Their life is disrupted when Mari's old college friend, Barbara, comes into it and begins a fling with Jeff, which causes Mari to contemplate an affair of her own.

Music
The theme song to this film is "We Could Have It All," sung by Maureen McGovern.  The song became a hit on the adult contemporary charts of Canada (#6) and the U.S. (#16).  It was written by Charles Fox and Norman Gimbel.

Cast
George Segal as Jeff Thompson
Natalie Wood as Mari Thompson
Richard Benjamin as Marv
Valerie Harper as Barbara
Bob Dishy as Howard
Arlene Golonka as Sally
Dom DeLuise as Walter 
Allan Arbus as Al
Priscilla Barnes as Helena
Catherine Hickland as Rebecca
Sondra Currie as Lainy
Oliver Clark as Max Dryden

Box office
Upon release, the film was disappointing at the box office.

References

External links

1980 films
1980s sex comedy films
American satirical films
American sex comedy films
1980s English-language films
Films directed by Gilbert Cates
Films scored by Charles Fox
Films set in Los Angeles
Universal Pictures films
1980 comedy films
Films set in the 1970s
Films about marriage
Films produced by Edward S. Feldman
Midlife crisis films
1980s American films